FC Shurtan Guzar is an Uzbek football club based in G‘uzor, Uzbekistan.

History
During its first years the club played in the lower divisions of Uzbekistan. In 2006 FC Shurtan made its debut in the Uzbek League. The 2010 season was the club's most successful season when they finished 4th in the league and were runners-up in the Uzbek Cup. In the quarter-final of the Uzbek Cup they beat Pakhtakor on aggregate and Lokomotiv Tashkent in the semi-final. Shurtan lost in the Final match, played in Tashkent, to Bunyodkor. The final score was 0–1.

In 2011 Shurtan made its international debut, playing in the AFC Cup. The club managed 2nd place in the group stage, but lost in their one legged round of 16 match against Al Wehdat. The final score being 1–2.

On 22 November 2011 Shurtan management appointed Igor Kriushenko as new head coach, he replaced Tachmurad Agamuradov. Kriushenko was fired on 5 July 2012 and was replaced by Edgar Gess who worked as head coach until May 15, 2013. Gess was also fired after poor results in League matches. Shurtan changed head coaches twice in 2013. The club were ranked 14th in the League and were relegated to the First League. After one year, in 2014, the club won the First League and were promoted back to the top division.

League history

Personnel

Current technical staff

Managerial history

Honours

Domestic
Uzbek League 4th place:
 2010
Uzbekistan First League (2):
 2004, 2014
Uzbek Cup runners-up (1):
 2010
UzPFL Cup (1):
 2015

Performance in AFC competitions
 AFC Cup: 1 appearance
2011: Round of 16

References

External links
 Shurtan Guzar – Official club website
 Shurtan Guzar – soccerway
 Weltfussballarchiv

Football clubs in Uzbekistan
1994 establishments in Uzbekistan
Association football clubs established in 1994